

Friedrich Brugger (1815–1870), was a German sculptor.

Brugger was born 13 January 1815 at Munich. He studied at the Munich Academy of Fine Arts, after which he stayed in Italy from 1841 to 1843. He returned to Munich where he received commissions from Ludwig I of Bavaria, including busts in the Ruhmeshalle and large bronze statues. Together with Johann Martin von Wagner and Johann von Halbig, he created the Quadriga on the Siegestor (Victory Gate) arch in Munich. He designed and modelled the sculptured form for the monument to Maximilian II, cast in 1860 by Ferdinand von Miller, for the central square of the Altes Schloss (Old Palace) on Maximilianstraße in Bayreuth.

Brugger died 8 April 1870, and is buried in the Alter Südfriedhof (Old South Cemetery) in Munich (Area 16, Row 10, Plot 26; at ).

Selected works
 1848: Monument to Christoph Willibald Gluck at the Promenadeplatz in Munich
 1852 Tomb of Johannes von Müller at the Altstädter Friedhof in Kassel (with Leo von Klenze; dismantled 1936, reconstructed 2009)
 1857: Monument to Jakob Fugger on Philippine-Welser-Strasse in Augsburg
 1857: Guard portrait by Hermann von Vicari in the Augustiner Museum at Freiburg im Breisgau
 1858: Monument to Duke Louis the Rich, in Landshut
 1860: Monument to Carl Philipp von Wrede in Heidelberg (dismantled and melted down, 17 April 1940)
 1861: Monument to Friedrich Wilhelm Joseph Schelling on the Maximilianstraße, Munich
 1861: Monument to the Elector Maximilian II at the Promenadeplatz, Munich
 1867: Monument to Leo von Klenze at the Gärtnerplatz, Munich

Bibliography
Pecht, Friedrich; Allgemeine Deutsche Biographie (ADB), "Brugger, Friedrich", Volume 3, Duncker & Humblot, Leipzig 1876, p. 409.

References

External links
 
 "Brugger Friedrich", Brockhaus and Efron Encyclopaedic Dictionary, Wikisource (in Russian)

Artists from Munich
19th-century German sculptors
German male sculptors
1815 births
1870 deaths